Portable Altarpiece with Pietà and Saints is a 1603 oil on canvas painting by Annibale Carracci in a gold, ebony and copper frame. It is now in the Galleria Nazionale d'Arte Antica in Rome.

A small altarpiece commissioned by cardinal Odoardo Farnese for his private devotions, its central scene shows a pieta with the dead Christ, the Virgin Mary, Saint John and Saint Mary Magdalene. The inner faces of the doors show Saint Cecilia and Saint Hermenegild above small scenes of their martyrdoms., whilst their exterior show Michael the Archangel and a guardian angel below a lunette of Christ and God the Father.

References

1603 paintings
Paintings by Annibale Carracci
Collections of the Galleria Nazionale d'Arte Antica
Paintings of the Pietà
Paintings depicting John the Apostle
Paintings depicting Mary Magdalene
Paintings of Saint Cecilia